The Tule Desert is located in southeastern Nevada in Lincoln County, near the Utah state line. The desert lies northeast of the Mormon Mountains, south of the Clover Mountains and west of the Tule Springs Hills.

A number of washes drain the desert in a generally north–south direction. The Tule Desert Well lies west of Jumbled Mountain at the south end of the Tule Springs Hills.

Access is via a county road east from Lyman Crossing along the Union Pacific railroad line between Carp and Elgin in Meadow Valley Wash. The road continues on to the south between the Mormon and East Mormon mountains to connect with Interstate 15 in Nevada at exit 100 west of Mesquite in Clark County.

References

Nevada Atlas and Gazetteer, 2001, pg. 67

Deserts of Nevada
Geography of Lincoln County, Nevada